Jane Simpson (born 4 February 1971) is an association football player who represented New Zealand at international level.

Simpson made her Football Ferns as a substitute in a 0–2 loss to Australia on 19 November 1997, and finished her international career with 17 caps and one goal to her credit.

References

External links

1971 births
Living people
New Zealand women's international footballers
New Zealand women's association footballers

Women's association footballers not categorized by position